Filippo Anfuso (1 January 1901 – 13 December 1963) was an Italian writer, diplomat and Fascist politician.

Biography
Anfuso was born in Catania. His writing career started with a volume of short stories and poetry he published in 1917. Anfuso subsequently joined as a reporter with the poet Gabriele D'Annunzio in his attempt to seize Fiume for Italy (1919–1921). He returned to write for La Nazione and La Stampa, reporting from various foreign countries. A friend of Galeazzo Ciano, the two passed the exam for a career in diplomacy at the same time (in 1925).

Anfuso was appointed to the Italian Consulate in Munich (1927), then to the missions in Hungary (1929), Germany (1931), the Republic of China (1932), and Greece (1934). In 1936, Anfuso was seconded to Francisco Franco's side during the Civil War. He was decorated for merit. In 1938, after Ciano was appointed Minister of Foreign Affairs, Anfuso became Ministry head of staff.

In 1942 he became Minister in charge of the Italian Legation in Budapest.  In 1943, after Mussolini escaped to Northern Italy with Nazi backing, Anfuso served as a diplomat for the newly founded Italian Social Republic, representing it in Berlin. As Ambassador in Berlin, he took care of the problems related to the presence in Germany of thousands of Italian servicemen deported after the 1943 Armistice. His role in trying to protect some Jews persecuted by the Nazis was mentioned during the Eichmann trial held in Israel in 1961. In 1945, he replaced the deceased Serafino Mazzolini as undersecretary for the Republic's Foreign Affairs Ministry.

On 12 March 1945 the Rome High Court of Justice tried Anfuso and condemned him to death in absentia. He was found guilty of having cooperated with the Germans after the armistice on 8 September 1944, and was sentenced to be shot in the back.

When the war ended in Italy's defeat, Anfuso had made his way to France, but was soon recognized and arrested there. He spent two years in prison, and after having been fully cleared by the French courts, he then exiled himself to Madrid.

Anfuso requested and received a new trial. In 1949 the Perugia court of assize completely exonerated him.

In 1950, he returned to Italy, going back to journalism and publishing several books. Having adhered to the Neo-fascist Italian Social Movement, he represented it in the Italian Chamber of Deputies. Anfuso died on 13 December 1963, aged 62, while speaking on the floor in the Parliament in Rome.

Family
On 13 April 1944, in Berlin, Germany, Anfuso married Kornélia "Nelli"  Tasnady-Szüts (died 1995, Rome). In 1948, they had a daughter, Carmelina (died 2000, Rome, without issue), and, in 1951, a son, Francesco (died 1968, Abruzzi).

Works
 1949, Du Palais de Venise au Lac de Garde, Calmann-Levy, Paris
 1950, Roma, Berlino, Salò (1936-1945), Garzanti, Milano, 1950
 1951, L'innocenza del mezzogiorno e altri racconti, Garzanti
 1951, Rom-Berlin im diplomatischen Spiegel, Pohl, München, Essen, Hamburg
 1952, Die beiden Gefreiten - Ihr Spiel um Deutschland und Italien, Pohl, München
 1957, Da Palazzo Venezia al lago di Garda 1936-1945, Cappelli, Bologna, 1957
 1959, Da Jalta alla luna, Tipografia Tambone, Roma, 1959
 1962, Fino a quando?, Edizioni del Borghese, Milano, 1962
 1964, Discorsi ai sordi, Ediltaroma, Roma, 1964

Citations

References
Albanese, Matteo, & Pablo del Hierro (2016) Transnational Fascism in the Twentieth Century: Spain, Italy and the Global Neo-Fascist Network. (Bloomsbury Publishing). .

1901 births
1963 deaths
Politicians from Catania
Italian Social Movement politicians
Deputies of Legislature II of Italy
Deputies of Legislature III of Italy
Deputies of Legislature IV of Italy
People of the Italian Social Republic
Italian diplomats
Writers from Catania
Journalists from Catania
Italian male journalists
Italian male poets
Italian male short story writers
20th-century Italian poets
20th-century Italian short story writers
20th-century diplomats
Italian people of the Spanish Civil War
Exiled Italian politicians
20th-century Italian journalists
20th-century Italian male writers